Tympanocryptis tolleyi, the Gawler earless dragon, is a species of agama found in South Australia.

References

Agamid lizards of Australia
Endemic fauna of Australia
Reptiles described in 2019
Reptiles of South Australia
Taxa named by Jane Melville
Taxa named by Mark Norman Hutchinson
Tympanocryptis